Wall Street Historic District may refer to:

Wall Street Historic District (Norwalk, Connecticut), listed on the NRHP in Fairfield County, Connecticut
Wall Street Historic District (Manhattan), listed on the NRHP in New York County, New York

See also
Wall Street (disambiguation)